Cornel Popescu (born 8 June 1960) is a Romanian bobsledder. He competed in the two man and the four man events at the 1984 Winter Olympics.

References

1960 births
Living people
Romanian male bobsledders
Olympic bobsledders of Romania
Bobsledders at the 1984 Winter Olympics
People from Roman, Romania